Daniel Curren Clark (January 18, 1894 – May 23, 1937) was a backup infielder/outfielder in Major League Baseball who played between 1922 and 1927 for the Detroit Tigers (1922), Boston Red Sox (1924) and St. Louis Cardinals (1927). He was born in Meridian, Mississippi.

In a three-season career, Clark was a .277 hitter (161-for-582) with five home runs and 93 RBI in 245 games, including 75 runs, 36 doubles, eight triples, five stolen bases, and a .360 on-base percentage. Following his majors career, he played in the Texas and Three-Eye leagues.
 
After his baseball career ended, Clark became an oil dealer, dying in his hometown of Meridian at age 43 from tertiary neural syphilis.

Fact
Was traded by Detroit along with Howard Ehmke, Babe Herman, Carl Holling and cash to the Red Sox in exchange by Del Pratt and Rip Collins.

References

Sources
Baseball Reference
Retrosheet
The Deadball Era

1894 births
1937 deaths
Boston Red Sox players
Detroit Tigers players
St. Louis Cardinals players
Major League Baseball second basemen
Major League Baseball third basemen
Baseball players from Mississippi
Sportspeople from Meridian, Mississippi
Minor league baseball managers
Meridian Metropolitans players
Gadsden Steel Makers players
Augusta Tourists players
Birmingham Barons players
Galveston Pirates players
Wichita Falls Spudders players
Atlanta Crackers players
San Antonio Bears players
Syracuse Stars (minor league baseball) players
Baltimore Orioles (IL) players
Springfield Senators players